Shahram Rostami is a former Iranian fighter pilot who was active in the Iran-Iraq War. With six definite aerial victories, against three MiGs  and three Mirage F.1s (with a single AIM-54 missile), he qualifies as a flying ace and one of the best scoring pilots of F-14 Tomcat.

Rostami held office as the deputy commander of Islamic Republic of Iran Air Force and the chairman of Joint Staff of the Islamic Republic of Iran Army.

Aerial victories 

Confirmed victories of Rostami include:

See also 

 List of Iranian flying aces

References 

Living people
Iranian aviators
Iranian flying aces
People from East Azerbaijan Province
Islamic Republic of Iran Army brigadier generals
Islamic Republic of Iran Army personnel of the Iran–Iraq War
1948 births
Iran–Iraq War flying aces
20th-century Iranian people
21st-century Iranian people